The Church of la Purificación (Spanish: Iglesia de la Purificación) is a church located in Escamilla, Spain. It was declared Bien de Interés Cultural in 1979.

The church is best known for its Baroque bell-tower or Giralda. The church itself was built in a Renaissance style. The retablo dates from the 16th century.

References 

Bien de Interés Cultural landmarks in the Province of Guadalajara
Churches in the Province of Guadalajara
Baroque architecture in Castilla–La Mancha